Bryce Cooper (19 December 1905 – 19 May 1995) was an Australian cricketer. He played two first-class matches for New South Wales between 1928/29 and 1929/30.

See also
 List of New South Wales representative cricketers

References

External links
 

1905 births
1995 deaths
Australian cricketers
New South Wales cricketers
Cricketers from Sydney